The 2019 Wyre Forest District Council election took place on 2 May 2019 to elect members of Wyre Forest District Council in Worcestershire, England. They were held on the same day as other local elections.

Background 
At the previous election, the Conservative Party had control with 21 councillors with the closest party being the Labour Party who had 4 councillors.

Summary

Election result

|-

The Conservatives lost their majority by losing 7 councillors taking their number to 14, while Health Concern and independent councillors made substantial gains while Labour halved their number of councillors from 4 to 2. Vicky Caulfield was the only Green Party Councillor to be elected in the district.

Following the elections, a coalition was formed between the Independent Health Concern, Independents, Liberal Democrats, Labour and Green councillors.

Council Composition

Before the election

After the election

Ward results

Aggborough & Spennells 

Helen Elizabeth Dyke, Peter Dyke and John Cedric Aston were elected.

Areley Kings & Riverside 

Claire June Barnett, John William Roland Thomas and Ken Henderson were elected.

Bewdley & Rock 

Anna Coleman, Calne Elaine Edinton-White and Roger Hugh Coleman were elected.

Blakebrook & Habberley South 

Tracey Onslow, Vicky Caulfield and Leigh Andrew John Robert Whitehouse.

Broadwaters 

Mary Alice Rayner, Peter Winston Montgomery Young and Sarah Elizabeth Nicole Rook were elected.

Foley Park & Hoobrook 

Nathan John Desmond, Sally Jane Chambers and Nicky Gale were elected.

Franche & Habberley North 

Susie Griffiths, Graham William Ballinger and Anna Louise L'Huillier were elected.

Lickhill 

Dixon Raynong Sheppard was elected.

Mitton 

Nicky Martin, Chris Rogers and Berenice Susan Dawes were elected.

Offmore & Comberton 

Frances Mary Oborski, Shazu Miah and Alan John Totty were elected.

Wribbenhall & Arley 

Paul Harrison and John Frederick Byng were elected.

Wyre Forest Rural 

Ian David Hardiman, Marcus John Hart and Lisa Joan Jones were elected.

By-elections between 2019 and 2023

David Ross was elected

Ben Brookes was elected

References 

Wyre Forest District Council elections
2019 English local elections
2010s in Worcestershire